Only One Life: The Songs of Jimmy Webb is a studio album by American singer Michael Feinstein, released in October 2003 by Concord Records. The album was recorded in tribute to the songwriter Jimmy Webb.

Track listing
All songs were written by Jimmy Webb.

 "After All the Loves of My Life"/ "Only One Life" – 7:01
 "Didn't We" – 4:21
 "Belmont Avenue" – 4:26
 "Up, Up and Away" – 4:18
 "She Moves, Eyes Follow" – 4:18
 "All I Know" – 4:06
 "The Moon Is a Harsh Mistress" – 4:20
 "Adios" – 4:04
 "Skywriter" – 5:06
 "Is There Love After You?" – 4:29
 "Louisa Blu" – 4:09
 "Time Flies" – 3:48
 "These Are All Mine" – 4:58
 "Piano" – 3:58
 "Only One Life" – 4:29

Personnel
Music
 Michael Feinstein – vocals, piano, liner notes
 Jimmy Webb – composer, piano, piano arrangement, producer, synthesizer drums, background vocals
 Mindi Abair – soprano sax
 Abe Appleman – violin (string quartet)
 John Beal – bass
 Alan Broadbent – arranger, orchestral arrangements, piano
 Jason Robert Brown – baritone vocals, vocal arrangement
 John Burk – executive producer
 Ronald Carbone – viola
 Barry Carl – bass
 Clifford Carter – piano
 Matt Catingub – orchestral arrangements, alto sax, soloist
 Robert Chassau – violin
 Roy Chicas – tenor vocals
 Krista Bennion Feeney – violin
 David Finck – acoustic bass, electric bass
 Barry Finclair – concert master, violin (string quartet)
 Maureen Gallagher – viola
 Monica Gerard – viola
 David Heiss – cello
 Ken Barward Hoy – viola
 Jim Hynes – piccolo trumpet, trumpet
 Semyon Kobialka – cello
 Regis Landiorio – violin
 Ron Lawrence – viola
 Ann Leathers – violin
 Richard Locker – cello (string quartet)
 Eliana Mendoza – cello
 Allison Miller – drums, percussion
 Jeff Mironov – guitar
 Ron Oakland – violin
 Suzanne Ornstein – violin
 Paul Peabody – violin
 Sue Pray – viola (string quartet)
 Clay Ruede – cello
 Richard Sarpola – bass
 Mark Orrin Shuman – cello
 Don Sklar – tenor vocals
 Richard Sortomme – violin
 Martin Stoner – violin
 Dale Stuckenbruck – violin
 Belinda Whitney – violin
 Frederick Zlotkin – cello

Production
 Jimmy Webb – producer
 Allen Sviridoff – producer
 Glen Barros – executive producer
 Ed Rak – engineer
 Brian King – engineer, mixing engineer
 Father's Angels – assistant engineer
 Jimmy Welch – assistant engineer
 Valerie Whitesell – production coordination
 Keith Shortreed – digital editing
 Abbey Anna – art direction
 Eric Barnard – hair stylist, make-Up
 Danny Flynn – stylist
 Dale Gold – photography
 Randee Saint Nicholas – photography
 David Leaf – liner notes

References

2003 albums
Michael Feinstein albums
Albums arranged by Jimmy Webb
Albums produced by Jimmy Webb
Concord Records albums
Tribute albums